Waddy is an unincorporated community within Shelby County, Kentucky, United States. Although it is an unincorporated town, it has a post office with the ZIP code 40076.

Waddy was shown as Station 318W in the Southern Railway Employee Time Table Number 67 dated November 15, 1942 (Sunday). The railroad had a 65-car siding at Waddy and 10-car additional capacity on other tracks at Waddy.

Notable people 

 Lucy Hicks Anderson, socialite and chef
 Tori Hall, beauty queen and reality television personality

References

Southern Railway System Western Lines St. Louis and Louisville Divisions Time Table No. 67 effective 12:01 A. M. Central Time Sunday November 15, 1942. From the Jacob E. Anderson Time Table Collection at the Special Collections of the Commerce Public Library, Commerce, Texas. 

Unincorporated communities in Shelby County, Kentucky
Unincorporated communities in Kentucky